Arnolfo is the Italian form of the given name Arnulf.

 Arnulf I, Archbishop of Milan (died 974), Archbishop of Milan
 Arnulf II, Archbishop of Milan (died 1018)
 Arnulf III, Archbishop of Milan (died 1097)
 Arnolfo di Cambio (born c.1240), architect

See also
Arnulf (disambiguation)